Paul Krenz (born 19 November 1991) is a German bobsledder.

He participated at the IBSF World Championships 2019, winning a medal.

References

External links

Paul Krenz at the German Bobsleigh, Luge, and Skeleton Federation 

1991 births
Living people
Sportspeople from Berlin
German male bobsledders